YOLO is the second studio album by South Korean girl group DIA which was released on April 19, 2017 by MBK Entertainment.

This marks their first release with the additions of Jueun and Somyi and first release as their nine member-group.

Background and release
On March 31 MBK Entertainment confirmed that the album would be released on April 19 on March 31 along with the reality show YOLO TRIP. Their first dance performance for the title track 'Will You Go Out With Me?' was on their first concert titled "First Miracle" at Yes24 Live Hall. The first band performance for the title track was on their mini concert titled "On The Record" on April 7 at Blue Square.

Two new members are introduced in this album, Jueun and Somyi. 'You Are My Flower' was released as a pre-release single for the album on April 6. Upon release, it charted at number one on Melon's Trot Songs Daily Chart.

Promotions
DIA held a mini concert titled "On The Record" on April 7 at Blue Square, and marked the first band performance of the title track 'Will You Go Out With Me'. They will also hold a comeback showcase for the album on April 19 7:30PM KST, and will be boardcasted live on V Live.

Track listing

Charts

Release history

References 

DIA (group) albums
Korean-language albums
2017 albums
Kakao M albums